Pat Johnson may refer to:

Pat E. Johnson (born 1939), martial artist
Pat Johnson (rugby union) (born 1960), American rugby union player

See also
Patrick Johnson (disambiguation)
Patricia Johnson (disambiguation)